Road 78 is a second class road in Iran connecting Yasuj to Yazd via Road 65 southern Abadeh.

References

External links 

 Iran road map on Young Journalists Club

78
Transportation in Fars Province
Transportation in Yazd Province